Aldo Reno Guidolin (June 6, 1932 – November 8, 2015) was a Canadian professional ice hockey defenceman and coach.

Guidolin began his career with the junior league Guelph Biltmores. He won the Memorial Cup in 1952 while still playing in a role as a two-way winger. After a partial minor league season with the Valleyfield Braves, Guidolin was called up to the New York Rangers and moved permanently to defence. He played 182 games in the National Hockey League with the club, serving as a regular at the blue line for two seasons before being relegated to the American Hockey League.

Guidolin played for the next fourteen seasons with Springfield Indians, Cleveland Barons and Baltimore Clippers, serving as a bruising defender with an offensive flare. He also coached the Clippers during his final three seasons as a player, before taking an NHL job as a scout with the Atlanta Flames. He later became the Colorado Rockies director of player development and served a partial season behind the team's bench as interim head coach.

Guidolin experienced a series of strokes after retirement. In his later life, he lived at an assisted living facility in Guelph, Ontario. He died on November 8, 2015.

He is the first cousin of fellow NHL player and coach Bep Guidolin.

Coaching record

References

External links

1932 births
2015 deaths
Atlanta Flames
Baltimore Clippers players
Canadian ice hockey defencemen
Colorado Rockies (NHL)
Colorado Rockies (NHL) coaches
Ice hockey people from Ontario
New York Rangers players
People from Caledon, Ontario
Canadian people of Italian descent
Canadian ice hockey coaches